Haring-Eberle House is a historic home located at Palisades in Rockland County, New York. It took its present form about 1865 and is a distinctive example of Gothic Revival style residential design.  Also on the property is a carriage house.

It was listed on the National Register of Historic Places in 1990.

References

Houses on the National Register of Historic Places in New York (state)
Gothic Revival architecture in New York (state)
Houses completed in 1865
Houses in Rockland County, New York
National Register of Historic Places in Rockland County, New York